Balanus is a genus of barnacles in the family Balanidae of the subphylum Crustacea.

This genus is known in the fossil record from the Jurassic to the Quaternary periods (age range: from 189.6 to 0.0 million years ago.). Fossil shells within this genus have been found all over the world.

Description
The bodies of these organisms are totally enclosed by a stony gray-whitish shell. The size of these shells ranges from 5 millimeters to 10 centimeters. They take the form of a cone consisting of six plates fixed on the rocks. The active animal can only be observed within the water when the shell opens and the barnacles expose two branched appendages (cirri ) regularly hitting the water to catch food. They mainly feed on plankton.

Habitat
These barnacles can be found in coastal areas at low shallow depth, although they can also be seen living out of the water. They commonly colonize stones, rocks and shells. They are found in abundance on the shells of mussels.

Species
Species within the genus Balanus include:

Balanus balanus (Linnaeus, 1758)
Balanus bloxhamensis Weisbord, 1966
Balanus borsodensis Kolosváry, 1952
Balanus calidus Pilsbry, 1916
Balanus campbelli Filhol, 1886
Balanus chisletianus Sowerby, 1859
Balanus citerosum Henry, 1973
Balanus connelli Cornwall, 1927
Balanus crenatus Bruguiére, 1789
Balanus curvirostratus Menesini, 1968
Balanus darwinii Seguenza, 1876
Balanus ecuadoricus Pilsbry & Olson, 1951
Balanus flosculoidus Kolosváry, 1941
Balanus gizellae Kolosváry, 1967
Balanus glandula Darwin, 1854 (Common Acorn Barnacle)
Balanus hohmanni Philippi, 1887
†Balanus humilis Conrad, 1846 (extinct)
†Balanus imitator Zullo, 1984 (extinct)
Balanus irradians Zullo & Guruswami-Naidu, 1982
Balanus irregularis Broch, 1931
Balanus kanakoffi Zullo, 1969
Balanus kondakovi Tarasov & Zevina, 1957
Balanus laevis Bruguiere, 1789
Balanus laguairensis Weisbord, 1966
Balanus leonensis Weisbord, 1966
Balanus microstomus Philippi, 1887
Balanus minutus Hoek, 1913
Balanus mirabilis Krüger, 1912
Balanus newburnensis Weisbord, 1966
Balanus nubilus Darwin, 1854 (Giant acorn barnacle)
Balanus ochlockoneensis Weisbord, 1966
Balanus pannonicus Kolosváry, 1952
Balanus parkeri Zullo, 1967
Balanus perforatus Bruguiére, 1789
Balanus poecilus Darwin, 1854
Balanus polyporus Pilbry, 1924
Balanus provisoricus Kolosváry, 1961
Balanus pulchellus Ren, 1989
Balanus rhizophorae Ren & Liu, 1978
Balanus rostratus Hoek, 1883 (Minefujitsubo) (Japanese acorn barnacle)
Balanus sauntonensis Parfitt, 1871
Balanus similis Weltner, 1922
Balanus spongicola Brown, 1844
Balanus subalbidus Henry, 1974
Balanus tamiamiensis Ross, 1964
Balanus trigonus Darwin, 1854
Balanus tuboperforatus Kolosváry, 1962
Balanus tumorifer Kolosváry, 1962
Balanus uliginosis Henry, 1973
Balanus vadaszi Kolosváry, 1949
Balanus veneticensis Seguenza, 1876
Balanus withersi Pilsbry, 1930

The species Balanus balanoides (common barnacle, common rock barnacle, northern rock barnacle) has been reclassified as Semibalanus balanoides in the family Archaeobalanidae, due to its membranous base.

References

External links

Barnacles
Pliensbachian first appearances
Extant Early Jurassic first appearances
Taxa named by Emanuel Mendes da Costa